Plátanos rellenos is a typical dish of Tabasco. It consists of plantain stuffed with meat and seasonings and fried.

See also
 Alcapurria
 List of stuffed dishes

References

Peruvian cuisine
Culture of Amazonas Region
Stuffed dishes